Ptuj Airport  is a sport and tourist airport, located to the north of Moškanjci near Ptuj in Slovenia.

References

External links 
 Ptuj Aeroclub site

Airports in Slovenia
Municipality of Gorišnica